The title Baron Berkeley originated as a feudal title and was subsequently created twice in the Peerage of England by writ. It was first granted by writ to Thomas de Berkeley, 1st Baron Berkeley (1245–1321), 6th feudal Baron Berkeley,  in 1295, but the title of that creation became extinct at the death of his great-great-grandson, the fifth Baron by writ, when no male heirs to the barony by writ remained, although the feudal barony continued. The next creation by writ was in 1421, for the last baron's nephew and heir James Berkeley. His son and successor William was created Viscount Berkeley in 1481, Earl of Nottingham in 1483, and Marquess of Berkeley in 1488. He had no surviving male issue, so the Marquessate and his other non-inherited titles became extinct on his death in 1491, whilst the barony passed de jure to his younger brother Maurice. However, William had disinherited Maurice because he considered him to have brought shame on the noble House of Berkeley by marrying beneath his status to Isabel, daughter of Philip Mead of Wraxhall, an Alderman and Mayor of Bristol. Instead, he bequeathed the castle, lands and lordships comprising the Barony of Berkeley to King Henry VII and his heirs male, failing which to descend to William's own rightful heirs. Thus on the death of King Edward VI in 1553, Henry VII's unmarried grandson, the Berkeley inheritance returned to the family. Therefore, Maurice and his descendants from 1492 to 1553 were de jure barons only, until the return of the title to the senior heir Henry (and indirectly to his mother Anne), becoming de facto 7th Baron in 1553. Upon his death he was succeeded by his relative George Harding.

His son, the ninth Baron, was created in 1679 Earl of Berkeley and Viscount Dursley, which remained united to the barony until the death of the sixth Earl in 1882, when the earldom passed to a male heir and the barony passed to a female one, Louisa Milman. At Louisa's death, the barony went to Eva Mary Foley, upon whose death the barony fell into abeyance. The abeyance was terminated a few years later in favour of Mary Lalle Foley-Berkeley. Upon her death, the barony went to her nephew Anthony Gueterbock, who is the present holder. In 2000, he was created Baron Gueterbock for life in the Peerage of the United Kingdom. The epithets of each baron were coined by John Smith of Nibley (d.1641), steward of the Berkeley estates, the biographer of the family and author of "Lives of the Berkeleys".

Feudal Barons of Berkeley

The feudal barony of Berkeley was created circa 1155, when King Henry II granted the royal castle of Berkeley to the Anglo-Saxon royal financier Robert Fitzharding under the feudal land tenure .

Prior to that time, Berkeley Castle had been held in fee-farm by Roger I "de Berkeley" (d.1093), a Norman nobleman, possibly a son of Roger I of Tosny (died circa 1040),  who acquired the surname "de Berkeley". Roger I "de Berkeley" held extensive lands in-chief of the king in 1086, as recorded by Domesday Book, including Dursley and retired as a monk to St Peter's Abbey, Gloucester in about 1091. His son Roger II (d. about 1131) and grandson Roger III (d. after 1177) also held the manor of Dursley in-chief of the king. In 1152 Roger III was deprived of the farm of Berkeley during the civil war between King Stephen and the Empress Maud. He was later restored to Dursley, and founded the family of "Berkeley of Dursley", but Berkeley Castle was granted by barony to Robert FitzHarding, a native Englishman and royal financier of Bristol, whose family also took the name "de Berkeley". To mollify the ill feelings of Roger of Dursley, Henry II encouraged each family to marry their respective male heirs to the eldest daughters of the other, which was successfully accomplished. The epithets below were assigned by John Smith (d.1640) of Nibley, household steward of the Berkeleys and author of Lives of the Berkeleys:

Robert FitzHarding, 1st feudal baron of Berkeley (d.1170/1) Robert the Devout.
Maurice FitzRobert FitzHarding, 2nd feudal baron of Berkeley (c.1120–1190/1) (otherwise "Maurice I de Berkeley") Maurice the Make-Peace, son, who in accordance with the wishes of King Henry II married Alice de Berkeley, eldest daughter of Roger III "de Berkeley" (d. after 1177) of Dursley.
Robert de Berkeley, 3rd feudal baron of Berkeley (c.1165–1220) Robert the Rebellious, son
Thomas I de Berkeley, 4th feudal baron of Berkeley (c.1170–1243) Thomas the Observer or Temporiser, brother
Maurice II de Berkeley, 5th feudal baron of Berkeley (1218–1281) Maurice the Resolute, son

Barons Berkeley, by writ, First Creation (1295)
From 1295 the feudal barony continued concurrently with the barony by writ. The feudal barony continued until the Tenures Abolition Act 1660. The feudal barony of Berkeley is especially important in that the barony by writ was deemed, extraordinarily, to be in effect a feudal barony (or barony by tenure), dependent on the tenure of Berkeley Castle. Thus when William Berkeley, 1st Marquess of Berkeley, 2nd Baron Berkeley (1426–1492), William the Waste-All, alienated Berkeley Castle to the king, he effectively disinherited his younger brother from the barony by writ.
Thomas de Berkeley, 1st Baron Berkeley, 6th feudal baron of Berkeley (1245–1321) Thomas the Wise, son.
Maurice de Berkeley, 2nd Baron Berkeley, 7th feudal baron of Berkeley (1271–1326), Maurice the Magnanimous, son.
Thomas de Berkeley, 3rd Baron Berkeley, 8th feudal baron of Berkeley (1293/6–1361) Thomas the Rich, son.
Maurice de Berkeley, 4th Baron Berkeley, 9th feudal baron of Berkeley (1320–1368) Maurice the Valiant, son.
Thomas de Berkeley, 5th Baron Berkeley, 10th feudal baron of Berkeley (1353–1417) Thomas the Magnificent, son, died without male progeny.

Barons Berkeley, by writ, Second Creation (1421)
James Berkeley, 1st Baron Berkeley (c. 1394–1463), James the Just, nephew and heir male.
William Berkeley, 1st Marquess of Berkeley, 2nd Baron Berkeley (1426–1492), William the Waste-All, son.
Maurice Berkeley, de jure 3rd Baron Berkeley (1436–1506), Maurice the Lawyer, brother.
Maurice Berkeley, de jure 4th Baron Berkeley (1467–1523), Maurice the Courtier, son. Died without legitimate progeny.
Thomas Berkeley, de jure 5th Baron Berkeley (1472–1533), Thomas the Sheepmaster, brother.
Thomas Berkeley, de jure 6th Baron Berkeley (1505–1534), Thomas the Hopeful, son.
Henry Berkeley, 7th Baron Berkeley (1534–1613), Henry the Harmless / Posthumous Henry, posthumous son.
George Berkeley, 8th Baron Berkeley (1601–1658), grandson. (No epithets coined after the death of John Smith (d.1640) of Nibley)
George Berkeley, 1st Earl of Berkeley, 9th Baron Berkeley (1627–1698), son (created Earl of Berkeley in 1679)
Charles Berkeley, 2nd Earl of Berkeley, 10th Baron Berkeley (1649–1710)
James Berkeley, 3rd Earl of Berkeley, 11th Baron Berkeley (1680–1736)
Augustus Berkeley, 4th Earl of Berkeley, 12th Baron Berkeley (1716–1755)
Frederick Augustus Berkeley, 5th Earl of Berkeley, 13th Baron Berkeley (1745–1810)
Thomas Moreton Fitzhardinge Berkeley, 6th Earl of Berkeley, 14th Baron Berkeley (1796–1882)
Louisa Mary Milman, 15th Baroness Berkeley (by birth: Berkeley) (1840–1899)
Eva Mary Foley, 16th Baroness Berkeley (by birth: Milman) (1875–1964) (abeyant 1964)
Mary Lalle Foley-Berkeley, 17th Baroness Berkeley (1905–1992) (abeyance terminated 1967)
Anthony Fitzhardinge Gueterbock, 18th Baron Berkeley (b. 1939), her nephew

The heir apparent is his son Thomas FitzHardinge Gueterbock (b. 1969)

Earls of Berkeley (after 1882, continuing the creation of 1679)
The Earldom of Berkeley, together with the Viscountcy of Dursley, was separated from the barony in 1882, but the succession was not fully established. In 1942 both titles became extinct or dormant.

George Lennox Rawdon Berkeley, 7th Earl of Berkeley (1827–1888), son of George Berkeley, who was a grandson of the 4th Earl
Randal Thomas Mowbray Berkeley, 8th Earl of Berkeley (1865–1942) (dormant 1942)

See also
Baron Berkeley of Rathdowne (subsidiary to the viscountcy Fitzhardinge, both in the Peerage of Ireland, 1663-1712)
Baron Berkeley of Stratton (the last of whom left his estate to the senior line)

References

Sources
George Edward Cokayne. The Complete Peerage. Volume 2: Bass to Canning, ed. Gibbs, Vicary, London, 1912, pp. 118–149, Berkeley
Sanders, I.J. English Baronies, Oxford, 1960, p. 13, Berkeley
Smyth, John (1567–1640). The Lives of the Berkeleys, Lords of the Honour, Castle and Manor of Berkeley from 1066 to 1618, ed. Maclean, Sir John, 3 vols., Gloucester, 1883–1885 (First published c.1628)

 Vol 1, 1883
 Vol 2, 1883
Vol.3, 1885

Baronies in the Peerage of England
Baron
1295 establishments in England
Extinct baronies in the Peerage of England
Noble titles created in 1295
Noble titles created in 1421